George Master (c. 1556 – will proven 1604) was the member of Parliament for the constituency of Cirencester for the parliaments of 1586 and 1589.

References 

English MPs 1586–1587
Members of Parliament for Cirencester
1550s births
Year of birth uncertain
1604 deaths
English justices of the peace
English MPs 1589